The James J. Peters VA Medical Center, (also known as the Bronx Veterans Hospital), is a US Department of Veterans Affairs hospital complex located at 130 West Kingsbridge Road in West Fordham, Bronx, New York City. The hospital is the headquarters of the Veterans Integrated Service Networks New York/New Jersey VA Health Care Network. This network is also the parent network to VA New York Harbor Healthcare System. 

The campus falls under the jurisdiction of the United States Department of Veterans Affairs Police and the United States Department of Veterans Affairs, Office of Inspector General.

History 

During the American Revolutionary War, the site of the medical center was the location of British '"Fort Number 6" (1777–1779). During the 19th century, the land was part of the estate of Nathaniel Platt Bailey. The site then became the property of the Sisters of Charity of New York who turned it into the Bronx Roman Catholic Orphan Asylum. The hospital opened as United States Veterans' Hospital no. 81 on April 15, 1922. 

By the 1970s, the original hospital had deteriorated to the point that a Life magazine article was written about it. One of the hospital's patients during this time period was Ron Kovic, who described the hospital as having "deplorable conditions". The hospital was eventually rebuilt in the late 1970s to address these issues.

The Bronx Veterans hospital was renamed after James J. Peters in 2002. Peters, a US Army veteran, was patient of the Bronx Veterans Hospital who founded several organizations to address the needs of patients with spinal cord injuries, including the United Spinal Association, originally known as the Eastern Paralyzed Veterans Association.

The Fisher House Foundation is building two Fisher houses on the James J. Peters VA Medical Center grounds in 2018.

Research 

The hospital has been a center of medical research for decades. Ludwik Gross who became the director of the Cancer Research Division started his research at the hospital in 1944. Beginning in the 1950s Rosalyn Sussman Yalow and Solomon Berson conducted research into radioimmunoassay. Their laboaratory at one point was a repurposed janitor’s closet.  The research culminated in Yalow receiving the 1977 Nobel Prize in Physiology or Medicine. (Her collaborator, Solomon Berson, who died in 1972 was not eligible for the prize, as Nobel prizes are not awarded posthumously.) In 1966 James Cimino and Michael J. Brescia developed the Cimino-Brescia fistula.

In 1985 a dedicated five storey medical research building connected to the main building was erected. The research building contains the Spinal Cord Damage Research Center, established due to the efforts of the Eastern Paralyzed Veterans Association (now United Spinal Association) and its director James J. Peters.

Personnel

 Rosalyn Sussman Yalow – Nobel laureate. Collaborated with Solomon Berson to develop radioimmunoassay.
 Solomon Berson – Collaborated with Rosalyn Sussman Yalow to develop radioimmunoassay.

 Nicholas J. Cifarelli – Nephrology. Later pioneered the first Bioethics Advisory Committee in the United States. 
 James Cimino – Developed the Cimino-Brescia fistula with Michael J. Brescia.
 Paul R. Cunningham - Surgeon. Later dean of Brody School of Medicine at East Carolina University.
 Shimon Glick - Worked in the laboratory of Berson and Yalow. Dean of the Faculty of Health Sciences at Ben Gurion University.
 Ludwik Gross – Director of the Cancer Research Division. Isolated murine polyomavirus.
 Victor Herbert – hematologist. Worked in the Nutrition Research Laboratory. Known for folate and megaloblastic anemia research.  
 David B. Levine – Orthopaedic surgeon. Various positions at the Hospital for Special Surgery.
 Charles S. Lieber – Clinical nutritionist. Known for research into excess alcohol consumption and cirrhosis of the liver.
 Giulio Maria Pasinetti – Director of the Translational Neuroscience Laboratories. Known for neurology at the Icahn School of Medicine.
 Jesse Roth – insulin researcher.
 Kenneth Sterling – Director of the protein research laboratory. Later made significant discoveries on thyroid hormone activation.
 Larry J. Siever – Psychiatrist known for his contributions to the study of personality disorders.

Deaths of notable people
 Ronald Hearn – United States Department of Veterans Affairs Police officer was shot and killed in the line of duty on July 25, 1988 
 Eric Burroughs – American stage and radio actor.
 Isaac Woodard
 Timothy Wright – Grammy-nominated gospel singer and pastor.

See also
 Veterans Health Administration
 United Spinal Association 
 VA New York Harbor Healthcare System
 Ron Kovic – patient in 1968. Author of Born on the Fourth of July
 Born on the Fourth of July – film based on Ron Kovic's autobiography

References

External links

 
 VA New York Harbor Healthcare System
 New York/New Jersey VA Health Care Network
 Bronx Veterans Medical Research Foundation

Veterans Affairs medical facilities

Hospitals in the Bronx
1922 establishments in New York City
Hospitals established in 1922
Teaching hospitals in New York City
Kingsbridge Heights, Bronx
Military facilities in the Bronx